If I Had a Hammer: Songs of Hope & Struggle is a 1998 compilation album by Pete Seeger and was released on Smithsonian Folkways as SFW40096.

This collection is a compilation of 24 songs selected from hundreds released on Folkways Records in the late 1950s and 1960s and two new songs recorded especially for this collection. Pete plays the 5-string banjo and the 12-string guitar and appears on some tracks with Almanac Singers and his grandson Tao Rodríguez-Seeger. The booklet contains detailed notes by Mark Greenberg explaining the origins of each song, as well as how their structures have evolved over the years.

The album is divided into segments addressing "unions and labor," "peace," "civil rights," and "hope."

Track listing

Notes
I'd Hammer In The Morning (Introduction): Track 1 
Solidarity Forever (Unions And Labor): Tracks 2-9 
Study War No More (Peace): Tracks 10-14
We Shall Overcome (Civil Rights): Tracks 15-18
I'd Hammer In The Evening (Hope): Tracks 19-26

References

1998 albums
Pete Seeger albums
Smithsonian Folkways albums